Father/Daughter Records is an independent record label based in San Francisco, California. It is owned and operated by Jessi Frick, a former marketing and publicity executive at Fiddler Records, and her father Ken Hector, and was formed in 2010. It was initially known for releasing early records by Mutual Benefit, Pure Bathing Culture, Levek and Oregon Bike Trails (now known as Cayucas).

The label has released songs by artists such as Shamir, Diet Cig, Remember Sports, Vagabon, Anjimile, Annie Blackman, and Partner. In 2018, Father/Daughter released its first book, Little Wonder by Kat Gardiner.

Stereogum named Father/Daughter Records one of the 6 Breakout Indie Labels of 2014.

Discography
The following are the albums released by the label:
FD-001 - Family Trees - Dream Talkin 7”
FD-002 - tooth ache - Skin 7”
FD-003 - Levek - Look on the Bright Side 7”
FD-004 - Mutual Benefit & Holy Spirits - Mutual Spirits split 12”
FD-005 - Oregon Bike Trails Cayucas - High School Lover 7”
FD-006 - Pure Bathing Culture - Pure Bathing Culture 12” EP
FD-007 - Leapling - Losing Face 10” EP
FD-008 - Cocktails - Cocktails 7” EP
FD-009 - Saskatchewan - Occasion (digital album)
FD-010 - The Everywheres - The Everywheres
FD-011 - Bent Shapes - Feels Weird
CD-FD-012 - Body Parts - Fire Dream
LP-FD-012 - Body Parts - Fire Dream 12” LP
FDD-001 - Running In The Fog - Silver EP
FDD-002 - Happy Diving - Happy Diving EP
FD-013 - Flagland - Love Hard
FD-014 - Various Artists - Faux Real 12” LP (RECORD STORE DAY)
FD-015 - Happy Diving - Happy Diving EP
FD-016 - Andy Sadoway - Str8 Sh00ter EP
FD-017 - Cocktails - Adult Life
FD-018 - Small Wonder - Wendy
FD-019 - Never Young - Master Copy
FDD-003 - Colours - You Can't See Me
FDD-004 - Spirit Kid - Is Happening
FD-020 - Rivergazer - Random Nostalgia
FD-021 - Sharpless - The One I Wanted To Be
FD-022 - Happy Diving - Big World
FD-023 - Never Young - Never Young
FD-024 - Various Artists - Faux Real II
FD-025 - Diet Cig - Over Easy
FD-026 - Anomie - s/t EP
FD-027 - Pupppy - Shit In The Apple Pie
FD-028 - Soft Cat - All Energy Will Rise
FD-029 - Running In The Fog - Silver EP
FD-030 - O-FACE - Mint
FD-031 - Diet Cig - Sleep Talk / Dinner Date 7”
FD-032 - PWR BTTM - Ugly Cherries
FD-033 - Remember Sports - All of Something
FD-034 - Hiccup - Hiccup
FD-035 - Addie Pray - Screentime
FD-036 - Never Young - NY Singles
FD-037 - Attic Abasement - Dream News
FD-038 - Lisa Prank - Adult Teen
FD-039 - T-Rextasy - Jurassic Punk
FD-040 - Follin - Follin
FD-041 - Plush - Please
FD-042 - Cocktails - Hypochondriac
FD-044 - Sat. Nite Duets - Air Guitar
FD-045 - Forth Wanderers - Slop EP
FD-046 - PWR BTTM - Projection
FD-047 - PWR BTTM - New Hampshire
FD-048 - Never Young - Singles Tape II: SoftBank
FD-049 - Hiccup - Imaginary Enemies
FD-050 - Loose Tooth - Big Day
FD-051 - Alex Napping - Mise En Place
FD-052 - Vagabon - Infinite Worlds
FD-053 - Remember Sports - Sunchokes
FD-054 - Nnamdi Ogbonnaya - DROOL
FD-055 - Diet Cig - Swear I'm Good At This
FD-056 - Pardoner - Uncontrollable Salvation
FD-057 - Who Is She? - Seattle Gossip
FD-058 - Art School Jocks - Art School Jocks
FD-059 - Fits - All Belief Is Paradise
FD-060 - Soar - Dark/Gold
FD-061 - Remember Sports/Pllush - Split 7"
FD-062 - Nadine - Oh My
FD-063 - Anna McClellan - Yes and No
FD-064 - Shamir - Revelations
FD-065 - Attic Abasement - Dancing is Depressing
FD-066 - Pllush - Stranger to the Pain
FD-067 - Pale Kids - Hesitater
FD-068 - Dama Scout - Dama Scout
FD-069 - Shamir - Room
FD-070 - Amy Fleisher Madden - A Million Miles
FD-071 - Lisa Prank & Seattle's Little Helpers - Gimme What I Want
FD-072 - Remember Sports - Slow Buzz
FD-073 - Dama Scout - Milky Milk
FD-074 - Whitney Ballen - You're A Shooting Star, I'm A Sinking Ship
FD-075 - Kat Gardiner - Little Wonder
FD-076 - Sir Babygirl - Crush On Me
FD-077 - Rose Droll - Your Dog
FD-078 - Tasha - Alone At Last
FD-079 - Moaning Lisa - Do You Know Enough?
FD-080 - Moaning Lisa - Do You Know Enough?
FD-081 - Partner - Saturday the 14th
FD-082 - Sir Babygirl - Praying
FD-083 - Esther Rose - You Made It This Far
FD-084 - Christelle Bofale - Swim Team
FD-085 - Lisa Prank - Perfect Love Song
FD-086 - Remember Sports - Sunchokes (Deluxe Edition)
FD-087 - Sir Babygirl - Crush on Me: BICONIC Edition
FD-088 - Christelle Bofale - Miles
FD-089 - Esther Rose - My Favorite Mistakes
FD-090 - Anjimile - Giver Taker
FD-091 - Anna McClellan - I saw first light
FD-092 - Esther Rose - How Many Times
FD-093 - Diet Cig - Do You Wonder About Me?
FD-094 - Tasha - But There's Still The Moon
FD-095 - Remember Sports - Like a Stone
FD-098 - Various Artists - Saving for a Custom Van
FD-099 - Various Artists - Simply Having a Wonderful Compilation
FD-100 - Tasha - Would You Mind Please Pulling Me Close?
FD-101 - S. Raekwon - Where I’m at Now
FD-102dig - Annie Blackman - Why We Met
FD-102dig2 - Annie Blackman - Souvenir
FD-102-dig3 - Annie Blackman - Seeds
FD-103 - Tasha - Tell Me What You Miss The Most
FD-104 - Anjimile - Reunion
FD-105 - Esther Rose - How Many More Times
FD-106 - Anjimile - Reunion (Instrumentals)
FD-107 - mui zyu - a wonderful thing vomits
FD-108 - Home Is Where - I Became Birds

References

External links
 

 
Indie rock record labels
Record labels based in California
Record labels established in 2010
American independent record labels